Tigar may refer to:

People
 Edward Wharton-Tigar (c. 1913–1995), British mining executive, World War II spy and saboteur
 Kenneth Tigar (born 1942), American actor
 Jon S. Tigar (born 1962), United States District Judge, son of Michael Tigar
 Michael Tigar (born 1941), American criminal defense attorney

Other uses
 Tigar Tyres, a Serbian tire manufacturing company
 Operation Tigar, a 1992 military operation
 Tigar, a character in The Tiger (1978 film); also the original name of the film
 TIGAR, the TP53-inducible glycolysis and apoptosis regulator protein

See also
 
 Tiger (disambiguation)
 Tigra (disambiguation)